Mark O'Connell (born 23 June 1979) is an Irish author and journalist. His debut book, To Be A Machine was published in 2017, followed by Further Notes From an Apocalypse in 2020. He has written for publications including The New Yorker, The New York Times Magazine, The New York Review of Books, and The Guardian. He is also the author of the Kindle Single Epic Fail: Bad Art, Viral Fame, and the History of the Worst Thing Ever (Byliner/The Millions).., as well as an academic study of the novels of John Banville.

Education and personal life 
O’Connell was born in Kilkenny in 1979, and grew up there. His father worked as a pharmacist. O’Connell has an older brother and a younger sister. O’Connell studied English at Trinity College Dublin (TCD). He completed a PhD in the novels of John Banville and graduated in 2011. He lives in Dublin.

Major works 
In 2017, O'Connell published To Be a Machine: Adventures Among Cyborgs, Utopians, Hackers, and the Futurists Solving the Modest Problem of Death (ISBN 9781783781973). Described by the New York Times Book Review as "a gonzo-journalistic exploration of the Silicon Valley techno-utopians’ pursuit of escaping mortality" it is an investigation of transhumanism. It was the winner of the 2018 Wellcome Book Prize, and the Rooney Prize in 2019.

O'Connell's second book, published in April 14, 2020, was Notes From an Apocalypse (OCLC: 1097672923). An investigative and deeply personal book about apocalyptic anxieties, it was described by Esquire as "deeply funny and life-affirming, with a warm, generous outlook even on the most challenging of subjects."

Essays
O'Connell has written noteworthy essays for The New York Times Magazine on the subjects of pessimism and parenthood, and the TV show Game of Thrones, and for The Guardian on turning 40, and the benefits of isolation

Awards 
O'Connell has been awarded the Wellcome Book Prize and the Rooney Prize. To Be a Machine was a finalist for the 2017 Royal Society Insight Investment Science Book Prize, and was shortlisted for the 2017 Baillie-Gifford Prize for Nonfiction.

Adaptations 
In 2020, it was announced that a theatrical adaptation of To Be a Machine was to be performed as part of Dublin Theatre Festival. Titled To Be a Machine (Version 1.0), the adaptation by theatre company Dead Centre, would see O'Connell's character played by Jack Gleeson. Owing to the Covid-19 pandemic, the performance was due to be online only, with audience members uploading themselves into the theatre.

Bibliography 

 
 
 
———————
Notes

References 

1979 births
Living people
21st-century Irish writers
The New Yorker people